Edward "Edwin" Fauver (May 7, 1875 – December 17, 1949) was an American football coach and college athletics administrator. In addition to his coaching duties, he was an athletic instructor at Columbia University and Wesleyan University.

Coaching career

Alma
Fauver was the head football coach at Alma College in Alma, Michigan for one season, in 1899, compiling a record of 2–1–3.

Oberlin
After his year at Alma, Fauvner became the head coach at Oberlin College in Oberlin, Ohio for five seasons, from 1900 to 1904, three of those seasons alongside his brother Edgar Fauver.  At Oberlin, his teams generated a record of 24–15–2.

Rochester
Fauver went on to become the head football coach and athletic director at the University of Rochester in Rochester, New York. He was the head football coach for the 1917 and 1918 seasons and achieved a record of 4–5–1. While at Rochester, he helped to form the New York State Conference of Small Colleges and the Western New York Intercollegiate Athletic Conference. On October 18, 1930, the school chose to honor him by naming the university's stadium in his honor.

Head coaching record

References

External links
 

1875 births
1949 deaths
19th-century players of American football
Alma Scots football coaches
Columbia University faculty
Oberlin College faculty
Oberlin Yeomen football coaches
Oberlin Yeomen football players
Rochester Yellowjackets football coaches
Wesleyan University faculty
People from Preble County, Ohio